Andreas Kronthaler may refer to:
 Andreas Kronthaler (sport shooter)
 Andreas Kronthaler (fashion designer)